Finnish-Serbian relations are foreign relations between Finland and Serbia.  Both countries established diplomatic relations in 1929 (then the Kingdom of Yugoslavia). Finland has an embassy in Belgrade.  Serbia has an embassy in Helsinki. Both countries are full members of the Council of Europe. Also Finland is an EU member and Serbia is an EU candidate.
Finland supports Serbia's European Union membership.

See also 
 Foreign relations of Finland
 Foreign relations of Serbia 
 Accession of Serbia to the European Union
 Serbs in Finland 
 Finns in Serbia
 Finland–Yugoslavia relations
 Croatia–Finland relations
 Finland–NATO relations 
 Serbia–NATO relations

References

External links 
  Finnish Ministry of Foreign Affairs about relations with Serbia
   Finnish embassy in Belgrade
  Serbian Ministry of Foreign Affairs about relations with Finland 
  Serbian embassy in Helsinki

 
Serbia 
Bilateral relations of Serbia